This is a list of Belgian television related events from 1959.

Events
15 February - Bob Benny is selected to represent Belgium at the 1959 Eurovision Song Contest with his song "Hou toch van mij". He is selected to be the fourth Belgian Eurovision entry during Eurosong.

Debuts

Television shows

Ending this year

Births
23 February - Lucas Van den Eynde, actor
30 November - Bart Peeters, singer, drummer, guitarist, actor & TV host
16 December - Michel Follet, TV & radio host

Deaths